Mi is a 2018 Burmese drama film, written and directed by Na Gyi. Paing Phyo Thu portrayed as the lead character "Mi", along with Nay Toe as Thaw Swe. The film is an adaptation of the novel "Mi" by prominent and well-respected novelist, Kyi Aye. Mi was produced by Victoria Film Production and premiered in Myanmar on November 9, 2018. Despite the high expectations, the film was well received by the audience. There were harsh public criticisms at Myanmar Academy Awards (2018) for leaving Mi with no award.

Mi received 2 nominations (Best Actress, Best Film) and 1 award (Best Director of Photography) at ASEAN international Film Festival and Awards (2019). Mi was also officially selected for Cardiff International Film Festival (2020) and Festival International de Cinema de Lleida Visual Art (2020).

Plot
“Mi” has nothing to lose. Everything to gain. But that doesn't necessarily mean she is winning in life. “Mi” is dying of Tuberculosis (TB), a disease with no cure at the time (Post War Period). “Mi” couldn't care less, with cigarettes and brandy as her close companions. Post-WWII Rangoon nightlife is her playground. She is popular among upper-class men and known for her cleverness and ability to fool men. No one knows her true back story.

Still, most men fall for her. Even though they knew that they would be played, men are always after “Mi”. Among those men, Mg Ko Lay is the young, naïve one and madly in love with “Mi” who treats him the same as other men. Unable to stand the emotional toll being with "Mi" causes him, Mg Ko Lay runs away from “Mi” by taking a job at a timber camp in the jungle, far away from Rangoon. There he meets Thaw Swe, his boss who treats him like his own brother. Thaw Swe gets to know “Mi”, through Mg Ko Lay's nightly heartbroken confessions. Mi's regular taunting letters to Mg Ko Lay, drive him crazy. One day, Mg Ko Lay commits suicide. Thaw Swe is dismissed because of the incident.

Thaw Swe wants to meet “Mi” who could drive a man to his own death. Thaw Swe comes to Rangoon, wanting to teach “Mi” a lesson. When they meet, everything changes. Thaw Swe learns stories of “Mi” from a lot of different men. Each man has different stories of “Mi”. Thaw Swe could not figure out which one is true. Even though Thaw Swe knows “Mi” is fooling him, he, too, can't help getting tangled with “Mi”. He soon realizes that he is becoming like Mg Ko Lay and finds himself trying to rescue “Mi” from herself.

But there is so much more that he doesn't know about “Mi”. Later he gets mixed up in a murder case of a rich man who has a connection with "Mi". Is Mi innocent? Mi is dying anyway. What's the motive? Thaw Swe doesn't understand “Mi” from the beginning. “Mi” doesn't try to prove her innocence either. Yet, Thaw Swe becomes an intimate player in the web of mystery that “Mi” has laid out, rife with dangers, corruptions, and deceits. Meanwhile, “Mi” has what she thinks is the bigger problem than any other thing, doubting her existence. Will Thaw Swe be able to help "Mi"? The real question is, “Does Mi really want to be helped?”

Cast
Paing Phyo Thu as Mi
Nay Toe as Thaw Swe
Ye Aung as U Ba Chit
Min Oo as U Tin Maung
Thar Nyi as Shwe Dar Myaung
Aung Ye Htike as Maung Ko Lay

Awards and nominations

References

External links

Mi on FilmFreeway

2018 films
2010s Burmese-language films
Burmese drama films
Films shot in Myanmar
2018 drama films